Shannon Edith O'Neill (born 1937) is a Canadian former politician. She served in the Legislative Assembly of British Columbia from 1991 to 1996, as a NDP member for the constituency of Shuswap.

References

British Columbia New Democratic Party MLAs
Living people
Women MLAs in British Columbia
1937 births